Mita Hachiman Jinja (御田八幡神社) is a Shinto shrine in Mita 3-7-16, Minato, Tokyo, Japan.  Its festival is on 15 August.

God's Name: Hondawakeno Mikoto (誉田別尊命), Amenokoyaneno Mikoto (天児屋根命), Takenouchi Sukuneno Mikoto (武内宿禰命)
Shrines in precincts: Gokō Inari Jinja (五光稲荷神社), Mikage Jinja (御嶽神社)
Facilities in precincts: Kaguraden (神楽殿: hall for Shinto music and dance), Chōzuya (手水舎: place for cleansing), Shamusho (社務所: shrine office).

Gallery 

Buildings and structures in Minato, Tokyo
Shinto shrines in Tokyo
Hachiman shrines
Religious buildings and structures completed in 709